Eos is a genus of parrots belonging to the lories and lorikeets tribe of the family Psittaculidae. There are six species which are all endemic to islands of eastern Indonesia, most within very restricted ranges. They have predominantly red plumage with blue, purple or black markings. Males and females are similar in appearance.

Their habitats include forest, coconut plantations and mangroves. They gather in flowering trees to feed on nectar and pollen with their brush-tipped tongues. Fruit and insects are also eaten. They make nests in tree hollows generally high in old large trees. Threats to these parrots include habitat loss and trapping for the cagebird trade, and one species, the red-and-blue lory, is classified as endangered.

Description
The plumage of Eos lories is predominantly red, set off with blue, purple or black markings. The bill is orange-red, the irises are reddish to reddish-brown, and the legs are grey. Males and females are identical in external appearance. They have a musky odour, especially noticeable in the black-winged lory, which is retained even in museum skins. Juvenile birds are partly striated owing to feathers with darker or dusky tips, and they have orange-brown to black beaks.

Species in the genus Eos are distinguished from lories in the genus Chalcopsitta by shorter tails and the absence of a bare patch of skin around the mandibles. Members of Eos do not have green plumage, which helps to distinguish them from some species of other lory genera.

Eos (Ἔως) is Greek for "dawn", referring to the red plumage.

Behaviour and ecology
The Eos lories feed on the nectar and pollen of various trees and plants. Very little is known about the diet of most species, but birds have been observed feeding on the flowers of coconuts, Eugenia, coral trees (Erythrina), Canarium, and sago palm (Metroxylon). In addition, they have been observed feeding on unripe fruits of fig trees (Ficus), and insects have been found in the stomachs of at least one species (the red lory). Some species are reported to be nomadic, moving between islands within their range in order to find food. These movements can apparently be daily as well, with the violet-necked lory making daily trips from its main islands to smaller offshore islands.

The Eos lories are apparently seasonal breeders, with birds prospecting for nesting sites varying by species, having been observed in June and July in the black-winged lory but August and September in the red lory. Like most parrots, they are cavity nesters, generally nesting high in older large trees either in forests or in modified habitats. Most of what is known about their nesting behaviour is derived from captive birds. They generally have a clutch size of two eggs which are incubated for 26–27 days. Chicks take around 75–87 days to fledge.

Status and conservation
 
Threats to these parrots include habitat loss and trapping for the cagebird trade. For example, between 1983 and 1989 an average of 3,200 red lories were trapped and exported per year, which has apparently led to declines in some parts of its range. The red-and-blue lory is an endangered species, and the black-winged lory is classed as vulnerable. The red-and-blue lory is listed under Appendix I of CITES, banning all trade in wild caught birds, while all other species are listed under Appendix II and require permits for their trade.

Taxonomy
The genus Eos was introduced by the German naturalist Johann Georg Wagler in 1832. The name is from the Ancient Greek eōs meaning "dawn". The type species was subsequently designated as the red-and-blue lory (Eos histrio) by the English zoologist George Robert Gray in 1840.

The closest relatives of this genus are the species in the genus Trichoglossus. The genera Eos, Trichoglossus, Chalcopsitta, and Pseudeos form a single clade within the lories and lorikeets. The cardinal lory (Chalcopsitta cardinalis) has sometimes been placed in the genus.

The genus Eos has six species and several subspecies:

Eos, Wagler 1832
Red-and-blue lory, Eos histrio, (Statius Muller 1776)
Eos histrio challengeri, Salvadori 1891
Eos histrio histrio, (Statius Muller 1776)
Eos histrio talautensis, Meyer, AB & Wiglesworth 1894
Violet-necked lory, Eos squamata, (Boddaert 1783)
 Eos squamata obiensis, Rothschild 1899
 Eos squamata riciniata, (Bechstein 1811)
 Eos squamata squamata, (Boddaert 1783)
Red lory, Eos bornea (Linnaeus 1758)
 Eos bornea bornea, (Linnaeus 1758)
 Eos bornea cyanonotha, (Vieillot 1818)
Blue-streaked lory, Eos reticulata, (Muller, S 1850)
Black-winged lory,  Eos cyanogenia, Bonaparte 1850
Blue-eared lory, Eos semilarvata, Bonaparte 1850

Species details

References

Arndt, Thomas (2007) Lexicon of Parrots. Accessed 31/07/07.

Cited texts

 

 Low, Rosemary. (1978). Lories and Lorikeets. The Brush-Tongued Parrots. Inkata Press: Melbourne. .

External links

 
Bird genera